Artiletra (a portmanteau of the Portuguese expression "Arte e Letra", meaning "Art and Letter") is a Cape Verdean bi-monthly newspaper/magazine. It is headquartered in Mindelo, and is the most circulated non-generalist newspaper in Cape Verde. Artiletra features articles and essays, as well as literary fiction (short stories and poetry), often by prominent Cape Verdean writers, covering topics such as the Cape Verdean culture, education, and science.

On April 15, 2001, the newspaper celebrated its 10th anniversary, on April 15, 2016, it celebrated its 25th anniversary.

Notable writers
One of the notable writers included Gualberto do Rosário who was also a politician.

See also 
 Newspapers in Cape Verde

External links 
 Development of the magazine "Artiletra" on IPDC Projects Database
 Jornal Artiletra - the newspaper's blog

Newspapers published in Cape Verde
Mass media in Mindelo
1991 establishments in Cape Verde